Şehzade Mahmud Celaleddin Efendi (14 November 1862 – 1 September 1888) was an Ottoman prince, son of Sultan Abdulaziz and his consort Edadil Kadın.

Early life
Celaleddin was born on 14 November 1862 in the Dolmabahçe Palace. His father was Abdulaziz, son of Mahmud II and Pertevniyal Sultan, and his mother was Edadil Kadın. He had a full sister, Emine Sultan, four years younger than him, who died in infancy. He was the favorite nephew of Adile Sultan, who had brought his parents together, and she wrote several poems to celebrate him.

His circumcision took place in 1870 in the Dolmabahçe Palace. Other princes who were circumcised along with Celaleddin included Şehzade Selim Süleyman and Şehzade Mehmed Vahideddin, sons of Sultan Abdulmejid I; Şehzade Mehmed Selaheddin, son of Murad V; Şehzade Yusuf Izzeddin, Celaleddin's own brother; and Sultanzade Alaeddin Bey, son of Münire Sultan, daughter of Abdulmejid I.

Navy career
In 1863, at a young age, he was registered in the navy. He was given the rank of sergeant and appointed to the First Division of Mahmudiye Imperial Galleons with three warehouses. In 1870, he was promoted to the rank of lieutenant commander. In August 1872, a room was also allocated to him in the headquarters of the ministry of navy, and a silver-plated sword was presented to him. In September 1872, he visited Izmit. In February 1872 or March 1873, he was promoted to captain. On 9 July 1873, he was promoted to rear admiral. On 23 December 1874, he was promoted to vice admiral.

Personal life
His only wife was Neylan Ahu Hanım. She was an Abkhazian from the Marshania princely family. They did not have children.

He had been allocated apartments in the Feriye Palace. He also owned a mansion known as "Bahçe Mansion". He was a pianist and flautist by avocation.

Later life and death
Abdulaziz was deposed by his ministers on 30 May 1876; his nephew Murad V became the Sultan. He was transferred to Feriye Palace the next day. Celaleddin followed him there. On 4 June 1876, Abdulaziz died under mysterious circumstances.

Celaleddin died on 1 September 1888 in the Feriye Palace, and was buried in New Mosque, Istanbul.

Honours

 Order of the House of Osman, Jeweled, 1872
 Order of the Medjidie, Jeweled

Military appointments

Military ranks and naval appointments
 1863: Sergeant, Ottoman Navy
 1870: Lieutenant Commander, Ottoman Navy
 February 1872 or March 1873: Captain, Ottoman Navy
 9 July 1873: Rear Admiral, Ottoman Navy
 23 December 1874: Vice Admiral, Ottoman Navy

Ancestry

References

Sources

 

1862 births
1888 deaths
Ottoman princes